This is a list of cities and states sorted by the IMF-based or World Bank based inflation rate. Inflation rate is defined as the annual percent change in consumer prices compared with the previous year's consumer prices. Inflation is a positive value in the inflation rate and means a general decrease in purchasing power for the domestic currency in the country in question and a general increase in prices of goods and services compared to the currency—if the inflation rate is negative, that indicates deflation, a general decrease in prices of goods and services traded for a country's domestic currency.

The table was originally based on International Monetary Fund's World Economic Outlook databook from October 2021, unless otherwise indicated with more timely news articles.

List of countries by five-year trend 
Countries are sorted by their inflation rate in 2021. Sources are the World Bank and the International Monetary Fund.

References

External links 
World Factbook Country Comparison :: Inflation rate (consumer prices) 2009 

Inflation